Façade – an entertainment comprising poems by Edith Sitwell read to instrumental accompaniments composed by William Walton – was first recorded, by its creators, in 1929. Over the next two decades Sitwell and Walton added numbers to the entertainment and removed others. A definitive edition was published in 1951. In 1977, after Sitwell's death, Walton released a set of eight poems and accompaniments not included in the 1951 score, titling it Façade Revived. After further revision the second work was published as Façade 2 in 1979. Most recorded sets of Façade made since then have included the 1970s additions, and some have also included a selection of Sitwell's poems for which no music is known to exist.

Discographies of classical compositions
Compositions by William Walton